Styginidae is a family of trilobite in the order Corynexochida.  Fossils of the various genera are found in marine strata throughout the world, aged from Ordovician up until the family's extinction during the Silurian.

Genera

References

 
Illaenina
Trilobite families
Ordovician first appearances
Silurian extinctions